The Sormonne is a  long river in the Ardennes département, northeastern France. Its source is at Taillette, near Rocroi. It flows generally southeast. It is a left tributary of the Meuse into which it flows at Warcq, near Charleville-Mézières.

Communes along its course
This list is ordered from source to mouth: Taillette, Éteignières, Regniowez, Neuville-lez-Beaulieu, Auvillers-les-Forges, Girondelle, Flaignes-Havys, Marby, Étalle, Blombay, Chilly, Laval-Morency, Le Châtelet-sur-Sormonne, Murtin-et-Bogny, Sormonne, Remilly-les-Pothées, Ham-les-Moines, Haudrecy, Cliron, Tournes, Belval, Damouzy, Warcq

References

Rivers of France
Rivers of Ardennes (department)
Rivers of Grand Est